John Michael (born Yannis Michail, 20 March 1974) is a Cypriot-born Greek darts player playing in Professional Darts Corporation (PDC) events.

Career

PDC 
He joined the PDC in 2009, and began competing in PDC Europe events a year later. He qualified for the 2011 European Championship, therefore becoming the first Greek player to qualify for a major PDC tournament. He was beaten 3-6 by defending champion Phil Taylor in the first round, with Taylor averaging 107.83.

BDO 
He joined the BDO in 2012. Michael has won numerous WDF-ranked darts tournaments, including the Cyprus Open (four times), the Greek Open (four times) and the Hellinikon Open (three times). He qualified for the 2015 PDC World Darts Championship while still playing in British Darts Organisation events. He played Jani Haavisto in the preliminary round winning 4–1 in legs, in the first round he played Ian White losing 3–1 in sets.

Return to the PDC 
Michael rejoined the PDC in 2015. After beating South Africa's Warrick Scheffer 2-0 in sets in the preliminary round of the 2016 PDC World Darts Championship, he was whitewashed by seventh-seed James Wade, 3-0 in sets. He entered the PDC's qualifying school that year, and his performance was good enough for second place on the Q School Order of Merit, earning him a Tour Card.

Being unable to enter all the events meant that Michael was unable to retain his Tour Card, but he went to European Q-School in January 2019 and was able to regain his card, finishing fifth on the Order of Merit.

After ending 2020 ranked 106th, Michael had to attend Qualifying School but successfully retained his Tour Card at the first time of asking.

World Championship results

BDO 
 2014: Preliminary round (lost to Madars Razma 2–3)

PDC 
 2015: First round (lost to Ian White 1–3)
 2016: First round (lost to James Wade 0–3)
 2017: First round (lost to Alan Norris 2–3)
 2022: First round (lost to Martijn Kleermaker 1–3)

Personal life 
Michael works as a farrier in Athens.

References

External links 

1974 births
Living people
Cypriot emigrants to Greece
Greek darts players
Professional Darts Corporation former tour card holders
British Darts Organisation players
Sportspeople from Athens
PDC World Cup of Darts Greek team